Stavros (Stavrós) is a village and beach in the Akrotiri district of the city of Chania, Crete, Greece and had a population of 460 (2011). The beach was the location where in 1964 Michael Cacoyannis filmed the famous beach dancing scene in the movie Zorba the Greek with Anthony Quinn.

Populated places in Chania (regional unit)